Blow: Blocks and Boat Docks is collaboration album between American rappers Messy Marv and Berner, the second album of their Blow series. The album features guest appearances from Brisco, Yukmouth, B-Legit, The Jacka, J. Stalin and San Quinn, among others.

It peaked at #48 on the R&B/Hip-Hop Albums chart, #16 on the Heatseekers Albums chart and #2 on the Top Heatseekers pacific chart. It is one of Messy Marv's most successful albums of his career, while Blow: Blocks and Boat Docks is the most successful for Berner.

A music video has been filmed for the song "Well Connected".

Track listing

References

2010 albums
Albums produced by Cozmo
Albums produced by Maxwell Smart (record producer)
Collaborative albums
Messy Marv albums
Sequel albums